Artem Andriyovych Darenskyi (born 7 July 2001) is a Ukrainian pair skater who currently competes with Sofiia Holichenko. With his former skating partner, Sofiia Nesterova, he is a two-time Ukrainian national senior champion. The pair has competed in the final segment at two World Junior Championships, finishing within the top eight at the 2019 edition.

Career

Early years 
Darenskyi began learning to skate in 2004. His first pair skating partner was Anastasiia Smirnova. The two won silver at the 2016 Ukrainian Junior Championships and gold the following season.

2017–2018 season 
Smirnova/Darenskyi became age-eligible for junior international events at the start of the season. Coached by Lilia Batutina in Dnipro, the pair competed at two ISU Junior Grand Prix assignments, placing 9th in Riga, Latvia, and then 11th in Minsk, Belarus.

Darenskyi and Sofiia Nesterova began their partnership around November 2017, coached by Batutina in Dnipro. Their training was limited due to a leg injury sustained by Nesterova, but the pair decided to compete at the Ukrainian Championships in December.

Nesterova/Darenskyi's international debut came in early February 2018 at the Toruń Cup in Poland. They won bronze and obtained the minimum technical scores required to compete at the 2018 World Junior Championships in Sofia. They qualified to the final segment at the March event in Bulgaria and finished 14th overall.

2018–2019 season 
Nesterova/Darenskyi competed at two ISU Junior Grand Prix events in September, placing fifth in Linz, Austria, and eighth in Ostrava, Czech Republic. In December, they won their second senior national title. Ranked eighth in both segments, they finished eighth at the 2019 World Junior Championships in March in Zagreb, Croatia.

2019–2020 season 
Nesterova/Darenski placed twelfth and tenth at their two JGP events. In November, they were fifth at the Volvo Open Cup. In December, they were nineteenth at the 2019 CS Golden Spin of Zagreb. They placed third at Nationals. They were chosen to compete at the 2020 Youth Olympic Games. Their Junior Pairs result became disqualified, though they were part of the bronze medal-winning team in the team event. They were disqualified at the 2020 European Championships.

In March, it was announced that Nesterova and Darenski were splitting up, as Nesterova had retired. In June, it was announced that he had formed a new partnership with Sofiia Holichenko.

2020–2021 season 
After obtaining the required minimum technical elements scores, Holichenko/Darenskyi were nominated to represent Ukraine at the 2021 World Championships in Stockholm. They withdrew a few days before the start of the competition, having tested positive for coronavirus.

2021–2022 season 
Holichenko/Darenskyi began the season at the 2021 CS Nebelhorn Trophy, attempting to qualify a berth for Ukraine at the 2022 Winter Olympics.  They placed eleventh at the event, outside the qualifications. However, Ukraine qualified to the Olympic team event due to Anastasiia Shabotova qualifying to the women's competition at Nebelhorn, allowing for a Ukrainian pair to be sent for that. Holichenko/Darenskyi went on to finish fifth at the Budapest Trophy.

After winning their first Ukrainian national title, Holichenko/Darenskyi placed fifteenth at the 2022 European Championships in Tallinn. Days later, they were named to the Ukrainian Olympic team. They finished ninth among nine pairs entered in the short program of the Olympic team event. This was their only performance at the Games, as Team Ukraine did not advance to the second stage of the competition and finished tenth.

The team returned home to Dnipro after the Olympics and immediately found themselves in the midst of Vladimir Putin's invasion of Ukraine. They enlisted Canadian music editor Hugo Chouinard to change their short program music in advance of the 2022 World Championships in Montpellier, hoping to inspire the country with Ukrainian music. They undertook a six-day journey to France, via Romania, Italy and Poland, with Darenskyi saying that their goal was "to show that Ukrainian athletes are fighting for their country." On arrival, they received a standing ovation and placed thirteenth in the short program with very limited training. In light of this, they opted not to compete in the free skate. They had left home knowing they would not be able to return, instead planning to live and train in the Polish city of Toruń for the foreseeable future.

Programs

With Holichenko

With Nesterova

With Smirnova

Competitive highlights 
CS: Challenger Series; JGP: Junior Grand Prix

Pairs with Holichenko

Pairs with Nesterova

Pairs with Smirnova

Men's singles

References

External links 
 
 

2001 births
Ukrainian male pair skaters
Living people
Sportspeople from Dnipro
Figure skaters at the 2020 Winter Youth Olympics
Figure skaters at the 2022 Winter Olympics
Olympic figure skaters of Ukraine